The 2013 Coca-Cola GM was the 43rd edition of the Greenlandic Men's Football Championship. The final round was held in Qaqortoq from August 15 to 21. It was won by B-67 Nuuk for the second consecutive time and for the ninth time in its history.

Qualifying stage

North Greenland

Disko Bay
G-44 Qeqertarsuaq and Ilulissat-69 qualified for the final Round.

Central Greenland
B-67 Nuuk and Nuuk IL qualified for the final Round.

East Greenland
Kuummiut-64 qualified for the final Round.

South Greenland
Eqaluk-54 qualified for the final Round.

NB Kissaviarsuk-33 qualified for the final Round as hosts.

Final round

Pool 1

Pool 2

Playoffs

Semi-finals

Seventh-place match

Fifth-place match

Third-place match

Final

See also
Football in Greenland
Football Association of Greenland
Greenland national football team
Greenlandic Men's Football Championship

References

Greenlandic Men's Football Championship seasons
Green
Green
football